Coraebina is a genus of beetles in the family Buprestidae, containing the following species:

 Coraebina affinis Obenberger, 1958
 Coraebina beatricis Obenberger, 1944
 Coraebina bilyi Akiyama & Ohmomo, 1993
 Coraebina birmaniae Obenberger, 1923
 Coraebina biroi Obenberger, 1958
 Coraebina bolovenensis Baudon, 1968
 Coraebina cambodiensis Descarpentries & Villiers, 1967
 Coraebina chloropicta (Kerremans, 1892)
 Coraebina fulgidiceps (Kerremans, 1892)
 Coraebina gentilis (Kerremans, 1890)
 Coraebina gongis (Gory, 1841)
 Coraebina ikomai Descarpentries & Chujo, 1961
 Coraebina kashmirensis Obenberger, 1934
 Coraebina kaszabi Obenberger, 1958
 Coraebina komiyai Akiyama & Ohmomo, 1994
 Coraebina leonensis Obenberger, 1958
 Coraebina malabarica Obenberger, 1934
 Coraebina minutesculpta Obenberger, 1958
 Coraebina monotona Obenberger, 1958
 Coraebina nickerli Obenberger, 1923
 Coraebina rondoni Baudon, 1965
 Coraebina saraswati Obenberger, 1958
 Coraebina specialis Obenberger, 1934
 Coraebina yunnanensis Obenberger, 1934

The correct spelling of this genus is Coroebina

References

Buprestidae genera